Qaleh (also Romanized as Qal‘eh; also known as Qal‘eh-ye Dīdār) is a village in Hesar-e Valiyeasr Rural District, Central District, Avaj County, Qazvin Province, Iran. At the 2006 census, its population was 149, in 42 families.

References 

Populated places in Avaj County